Yara Flor is a superhero appearing in American comic books published by DC Comics. She is one of the heroines to use the identity of Wonder Girl. Created by Joëlle Jones, she first appeared in Dark Nights: Death Metal #7 (January 2021).

Yara is depicted as the next Wonder Woman in the future viewed by Diana in the event Future State.

Publication history 
According to the character's creator, Joëlle Jones, Yara's appearance was inspired by Brazilian model .

Fictional character biography 
Yara Flor is the daughter of an Amazon and a Brazilian river god, who becomes the defender of the Esquecida Amazon tribe. The character debuted in January 2021 as part of DC Comic's "Future State" storyline, in which she is shown to be the Wonder Woman of the future. In the present day DC Universe, Yara is introduced as part of the Infinite Frontier publishing event. She is unaware of her Amazon heritage, but, responding to a prophecy that will determine if Yara destroys the Amazons or saves them, the Olympian Gods and the Amazons of Themiscyra, Bana-Mighdall, and a third tribe in the Amazon rainforest separately begin to converge on her location as she makes a trip from the US to Brazil, the country of her birth. Queen Hippolyta sends Wonder Girl Cassie Sandsmark to protect Yara, where Cassie encounters Artemis of Bana-Mighdall.

While on a plane, Yara is attacked by a couple of her people in the Amazon, and accidentally causes a hole in the plane causing it to crash. She is hit by an arrow from Eros (who was sent by Hera) who falls in love with her after accidentally cutting himself with his own arrow. 

Yara mets Hera, and tells Chiron to train her. Yara learns how to fight using a bola and befriends a Pegasus and calls him Jerry.  Eros tells her that Hera is training Yara to be her champion, and Eros wants Yara to drink the elixir of immortality so she can be with him forever. Yara convinces Eros to let her come back to the mortal realm to meet a man whom she had feelings for name Joao, and Yara meets a Brazilian Amazon name Potira who explains that Yara's mother was a Greek Amazon who fell in love with a man and gave birth to her. An Amazon tribe in Brazil took Yara's family in, until Ares killed her mother. Cassie Sandsmark and Artemis of Bana-Mighdall eventually find Yara, and tells Yara that if she sides with Hera, it will cause the destruction of the Amazons.

Hera asks Yara to drink the ambrosia which will render her immortal. She declines and fights her way out of Olympus. During the chaos, Jerry is hurt by Pegasus, and Yara comes back to Mount Olympus to take revenge, but Hera defeats her and sends her to Hephaestus.

In Dark Crisis #1, Jonathan Samuel Kent tries to convince Yara to join his new Justice League team after Pariah killed all the current Justice League members. Yara rebukes Jonathan's offer and leaves him. However she returns after Deathstroke attacks the Titans Tower in issue #3, and learns from Alan Scott and Swamp Thing that Pariah is corrupting The Great Darkness. She participates in the final battle with Dick Grayson's group where she distracts Pariah long enough for Jace Fox and Mister Terrific to defeat Pariah. At the end of the event, Yara helps clean up the Hall of Justice with the rest of the heroes.

Powers and abilities 
As an Amazon-Guarani demigoddess, Yara inherits abilities the average Amazon does not. Yara has superhuman strength, speed, reflexes, durability, agility and senses. Yara also has the ability of hydrokinesis, which she discovers after she gets her golden bolas. Yara also rides a white winged horse from Olympus named Jerry.

Critical Reception 
The character was received positively by both fans and critics, with critics naming Yara Flor the standout from Future State. Samantha Nelson from Polygon wrote "DC’s clearly betting big on Yara, but her debut shows tremendous promise. It’s a glimpse at a new version of Wonder Woman that’s grounded in modern fantasy as much as superhero comics, providing ammo for a huge number of thrilling new stories."

Other versions 

 In the possible future of the "Future State" storyline, Yara takes up the mantle of Wonder Woman and is a member of the Justice League.

In other media 
 The CW, Greg Berlanti, and Dailyn Rodriguez intended to develop a Wonder Girl TV series focusing on Yara Flor. However, The CW decided not to move forward with the series as of February 2021.
 Yara Flor as Wonder Woman appears in DC Legends.

References

Brazilian superheroes
Comics characters introduced in 2021
DC Comics characters with superhuman senses
DC Comics characters with superhuman strength
DC Comics characters who can move at superhuman speeds
Fictional characters with water abilities
DC Comics female superheroes
DC Comics hybrids
DC Comics Amazons
DC Comics sidekicks
Fictional demigods
Fictional Brazilian people
Fictional women soldiers and warriors
Fictional archers
Fictional swordfighters in comics
Teenage characters in comics
Wonder Woman characters
Fictional indigenous people of the Americas